WNAC-TV (channel 64), branded on-air as Fox Providence, is a television station in Providence, Rhode Island, United States, affiliated with Fox and The CW. It is owned by Mission Broadcasting, which maintains a local marketing agreement (LMA) with Nexstar Media Group, owner of dual CBS/MyNetworkTV affiliate WPRI-TV (channel 12), for the provision of certain services. Both stations share studios on Catamore Boulevard in East Providence, Rhode Island, while WNAC-TV's transmitter is located on Homestead Avenue in Rehoboth, Massachusetts.

History

As WNET (1953–1956)
Although WNAC's current incarnation dates to September 5, 1981, its analog license was one of the oldest active ultra high frequency (UHF) licenses in New England. It first signed on August 29, 1953, as WNET, the second television station in Rhode Island. At that time, it broadcast on channel 16 and affiliated with ABC. It also shared DuMont programming with NBC station WJAR-TV.

Conventional wisdom suggested that, as the second station in the area, WNET should have taken the CBS affiliation. However, WPRO-TV (now WPRI-TV) had won a construction permit just before WNET received its permit and had already been promised the CBS affiliation due to its radio sister's long affiliation with CBS Radio. WPRO-TV was originally supposed to sign on in spring 1953 from a transmitter in Rehoboth, Massachusetts. However, town officials forced WPRO-TV to move its transmitter site to Johnston, Rhode Island.

Although this pushed back channel 12's planned sign-on to 1954, CBS refused to let WNET carry its programming in the meantime due to a weak signal, preferring to keep its secondary affiliation with WJAR. This did not change even after Hurricane Carol destroyed WPRO-TV's transmitter just before it was due to sign on. WNET struggled against dominant WJAR because television manufacturers were not required to include UHF tuning capability. Viewers had to buy an expensive converter to receive WNET, and even then the picture quality was marginal at best. It did not help matters that Boston's WBZ-TV and the original WNAC-TV, also in Boston, both decently covered the Providence area.

When WPRO-TV finally signed on in 1955 from a transmitter in Rehoboth, ABC allowed it to cherry-pick some of its most popular programming despite the fact that WNET was the ABC affiliate of record in the market. This move by ABC proved fatal to WNET. Only months earlier, DuMont had announced it was all but getting out of network television. The station had been badly under-capitalized from the start, and required sustenance from the stronger network shows. It did not have nearly enough resources to buy an additional 16 hours of programming per day. With DuMont in its death throes, and few choices for alternative programming available, WNET closed down almost unnoticed in 1956.

The license remained active for 25 years largely because the Federal Communications Commission (FCC) was wary of deleting silent UHF stations. In the 1960s, the FCC reassigned channels 14 through 20 for two-way radio use and Providence's silent channel 16 license was moved to channel 64. However, it remained under the ownership "Channel 16 of Providence" for many years. The WNET calls were picked up by a PBS member station in Newark, New Jersey, in 1970. On September 22, 1980, the dormant channel 64 changed its calls to WSTG. The CP was sold to another owner known as Topcor Inc.

As WSTG/WNAC (1981–present)
Topcor returned channel 64 to the air in December 1981, originally operating from studios adjacent to its transmitter located on Pine Street in Rehoboth. It was the first general-entertainment independent station in Rhode Island. Initially, it was only on the air for four hours a day, the minimum required to cover the license. Its schedule consisted of public domain movies, public domain film shorts, and business news programming from the Financial News Network. Soon after, it added several religious shows (like The 700 Club and The PTL Club) and expanded to about seven hours a day. In the fall of 1982, WSTG began signing-on at noon with religious shows, adding classic and recent cartoons starting at 3:00 p.m., some low-budget drama shows starting at 6:00 p.m., a prime-time movie at 8:00 p.m., and more religious shows at 10:00 p.m., finally signing-off by 1:00 a.m. Topcor sold the station to Providence TV Ltd. in 1983. In January 1984, WSTG began signing on at 6:00 a.m., expanding its broadcast day to 19 hours.

Under new ownership, the station continued running older cartoons like Bugs Bunny, Scooby-Doo, The Flintstones, and Tom and Jerry among others during early mornings and late afternoons. Religious shows occupied late mornings. Older movies occupied prime time. Older sitcoms like Bewitched, I Love Lucy, The Andy Griffith Show, The Beverly Hillbillies, and I Dream of Jeannie among others occupied midday hours and evenings. Although WSTG received modest ratings, financial problems led Providence TV to sell the station again in 1986 to Sudbrink Broadcasting, which changed the calls to the current WNAC-TV on September 22 of that year. The WNAC-TV calls had last been used in Boston on one of the stations that indirectly caused WNET's demise in 1956. That station is now independent WHDH (but operates on a separate license from the old WNAC). The station was sold including barter programs and some movies, but the cash programs, coming mostly from Viacom, were excluded.

The station would change hands in October 1986. On the last three days before Sudbrink bought the station, it ran marathons of the shows not remaining on the station after closing. Sudbrink kept the cartoons, some of the movies, and a couple of older barter sitcoms. It also upgraded the schedule with several recent off network sitcoms and drama shows as well as newer movies. It also became one of the charter affiliates of Fox on October 9, 1986.

However, Sudbrink's ambitious ownership would not last long. The ink had barely dried on its purchase of channel 64 when it was forced into Chapter 11 bankruptcy. WNAC was then sold to Price Communications in the spring of 1988. Price sold WNAC, along with three of its stations—WZZM-TV in Grand Rapids, Michigan, WSEE-TV in Erie, Pennsylvania, and WAPT-TV in Jackson, Mississippi—to Northstar Television Group in 1989. In the 1990s, WNAC began to add more talk and reality shows to its lineup. Northstar sold three of its stations (WNAC, WZZM, and WAPT) to Argyle II in 1994.

In 1996, Argyle entered into a LMA with WPRI, then owned by Clear Channel Communications. The partnership with WPRI was ironic, since channel 12's sign-on had sealed WNET's fate 40 years earlier. As part of the deal, WNAC's operations were moved to WPRI's studios in East Providence. The popular animated three-dimensional "Fox 64" logo that was used from 1989 to 1995 was changed to a more generic "Fox 64" logo that was used from 1996 to 2002.

In 1998, after Argyle merged with Hearst Corporation's broadcasting unit (creating Hearst-Argyle Television), it swapped WNAC along with WDTN in Dayton, Ohio, to Sunrise Television in exchange for WPTZ in Plattsburgh, New York, WNNE in Hartford, Vermont, and KSBW in Salinas, California. This was due to a significant signal overlap with WCVB-TV as well as WDTN's signal overlap with WLWT (which had been acquired by Argyle II in January 1997 as a result of a swap which also involved WZZM). The former station's city-grade signal covers nearly all of the Providence market, as is the case with most of Boston's major stations. At the time, the FCC normally did not allow common ownership of two stations with overlapping signals and would not even consider granting a waiver for a city-grade overlap. Sunrise bought WPRI from Clear Channel in 2000, then sold WNAC to LIN TV in early 2001, since FCC regulations do not allow common ownership of two of the four highest-rated stations in the same market.

However, LIN TV was forced to put WNAC back on the market almost as soon as it closed on the station's purchase due to the ownership structures of Sunrise and LIN TV. Hicks, Muse, Tate & Furst (now HM Capital), a private-equity firm co-founded by Texas Rangers and Dallas Stars owner Tom Hicks, owned controlling interest in LIN TV. At the same time, HMTF also controlled a large block of Sunrise stock. The FCC ruled that HMTF's stake in Sunrise was large enough that it could not own a station in markets where LIN TV owned a station as well.

It took LIN TV nearly a year to find a suitable buyer for WNAC. In April 2002, LIN TV sold the station to Super Towers, Inc., a broadcasting tower company, owned by Timothy Sheehan, a brother-in-law of former LIN TV vice president Paul Karpowicz (formerly the president of Meredith Corporation's Local Media subsidiary until its 2021 sale to Gray Television). LIN held an option to repurchase channel 64, which was inherited by the company's subsequent owners Media General and Nexstar. This sale allowed Sunrise and LIN TV to complete their merger the following month. WNAC's LMA with WPRI continued, with Super Towers doing business as "WNAC, LLC".

Since 2006
On January 24, 2006, The WB and UPN announced that the networks would cease broadcasting and merge into a new network called The CW. In response, News Corporation announced on February 22 that it would start up another new network called MyNetworkTV to give UPN and WB stations not joining The CW another option besides becoming independent. It was a given that primary UPN and secondary WB affiliate WLWC would become Rhode Island's CW station based on its ownership by CBS. The MyNetworkTV affiliation in Rhode Island then went to WNAC which initially carried the network as a secondary affiliation. The network began broadcasting on September 5 while WLWC joined The CW on September 18. Until October 1, 2009, WNAC delayed MyNetworkTV's prime time programming until 11:00 p.m. on weeknights; on that date, the station moved the MyNetworkTV affiliation to its second digital subchannel.

On May 18, 2007, LIN TV announced that it was exploring strategic alternatives that could have resulted in the sale of the company. On October 12, WNAC invoked the FCC's network non-duplication rule resulting in Comcast blacking out Fox prime time and sports programming from Fox owned-and-operated WFXT in Boston on its cable systems in New Bedford and Bristol County, Massachusetts. This change did not affect the airing of that station's syndicated lineup or local newscasts.

WNAC-TV discontinued regular programming on its analog signal, over UHF channel 64, on February 17, 2009, the original date when full-power television stations in the United States were to transition from analog to digital broadcasts under federal mandate (which was later pushed back to June 12, 2009). The station moved its digital signal from UHF channel 54 to VHF channel 12, using Program and System Information Protocol to display the station's virtual channel as its former UHF analog channel 64, which (as with its original digital channel allocation) was among the high band UHF channels (52–69) that were removed from broadcasting use as a result of the transition.

On March 21, 2014, LIN Media entered into an agreement to merge with Media General in a $1.6 billion deal. Because Media General owned NBC affiliate WJAR (channel 10), the companies had to sell either WJAR or WPRI-TV to another station owner to comply with FCC ownership rules as well as planned changes to those rules regarding same-market television stations which would prohibit sharing agreements; the LMA involving WNAC was included in the sale. On August 20, 2014, Media General announced that it would keep WPRI and the LMA with WNAC and sell WJAR to Sinclair Broadcast Group. The merger was completed on December 19.

On August 31, 2020, Nexstar exercised its option to purchase WNAC through its partner company Mission Broadcasting. The sale was completed on June 16, 2021.

WNAC-DT2
WNAC-DT2, branded on-air as The CW Providence, is the CW-affiliated second digital subchannel of WNAC-TV, broadcasting in 720p high definition on channel 64.2.

The 64.2 subchannel originally aired a 24-hour local weather channel known as the "Eyewitness News Pinpoint Weather Station". This became offered exclusively on Cox digital channel 125 in 2007 for unknown reasons. WNAC-DT2 then switched to a live feed of WPRI's weather radar. On October 1, 2009, the subchannel was relaunched as a MyNetworkTV affiliate, branded MyRITV.

The programming and CW affiliation of WLWC's main channel was purchased by Nexstar in 2017 after WLWC's owner, OTA Broadcasting, sold its spectrum in the FCC's 2016 incentive auction. On October 2, 2017, at 12:30 p.m., The CW Providence vacated its old channel 28.1 location (which was converted into an Ion Life affiliate, per an agreement to share channel 17 with Ion owned-and-operated station WPXQ-TV), relocating WLWC's CW and syndicated programming to channel 64.2. That day, MyRITV was moved to WPRI's second subchannel, to balance bandwidth among all four of Nexstar's major network affiliations in Providence.

News operation
In 1996, WPRI began producing the market's first nightly prime-time newscast at 10:00 p.m. on WNAC called Fox News Providence, eventually titled Fox 64 News at 10:00. This was joined in April 1997 by a WJAR-produced show seen weeknights on WLWC entitled TV 28 News at 10. However, that was dropped in September when the WJAR LMA with WLWC ended. In 2004, an hour-long extension of WPRI's weekday morning newscast was added to WNAC at 7:00 a.m. branded as Eyewitness News This Morning on Fox Providence. It was eventually cancelled, but was brought back early in 2009 to precede The Rhode Show.

WNAC and WPRI received an on-air overhaul introducing a new news set and updated graphics on March 17, 2008.

On February 18, 2009, WNAC launched an hour-long lifestyle and entertainment magazine-type program called The Rhode Show that aired weekday mornings at 8:00 a.m. A new secondary set for the show was built with a fully functional kitchen. The show was previously hosted by the weekday morning news anchor teams (Vince DeMentri and Elizabeth Hopkins from February 2009 to March 2010, Patrick Little and Hopkins from March 2010 to November 2010, and Little and Danielle North from November 2010 to December 2011). A third host for a period of one year was found annually through open audition in a contest titled The Rhode Show Search for a Star. In 2008, Boston-area radio deejay Shawn Tempesta won the contest out of over 140 people. In 2009, Cranston comedian Ben Hague beat out over 100 other hopefuls. Bridgewater State University graduate Michaela Johnson of East Providence won the honor in 2010. During the week, The Rhode Show was streamed live on WNAC's website. The main channel re-aired the show weekday afternoons at 1:00 p.m. with WNAC-DT2 (MyRITV) doing the same at 4:00 p.m.

On September 20, 2011, WPRI and WNAC became the last two stations in Rhode Island to begin broadcasting their newscasts in high definition (HD). Set reconfiguration began on July 22, 2011, and lasted nearly two months. Newscasts in the interim aired from The Rhode Show studio. WJAR was the first in Rhode Island to have made the upgrade, on May 16, 2011, followed by WLNE on September 13, 2011. Eyewitness News has won the Massachusetts/Rhode Island Associated Press News Station of the Year award nine years in a row since 2004, its most recent coming in May 2012.

In December 2011, it was announced that on January 9, 2012, The Rhode Show would move to WPRI and would now begin at 9:00 a.m. Michaela Johnson and former WPRO-FM (92 PRO-FM) personality Will Gilbert became permanent hosts of the show and Mary Larsen was selected as the third host in the 2011 Search for a Star contest. MyRITV now re-airs the show at 2:00 p.m. on weekdays. In addition, Eyewitness News This Morning on Fox Providence was extended to fill the hour previously occupied by The Rhode Show. The newscast now airs from 7:00 to 9:00 a.m. As a result of the 2012 World Series preempting late evening newscasts normally seen on the main WNAC channel, MyRITV began airing live newscasts featuring continuing coverage of Hurricane Sandy. This channel now regularly airs newscasts in the event they are preempted on the main channels. On January 13, 2014, WPRI announced that it would be expanding its early evening news by launching a 6:30 p.m. newscast on WNAC on January 27. Also in 2014, WNAC began simulcasting WPRI's weekday morning newscasts from 4:30 to 7:00 a.m.

On August 31, 2020, WPRI dropped the Eyewitness News branding after 18 years; WPRI's newscasts are now branded as 12 News, while WNAC's newscasts are now branded as 12 News Now on Fox Providence. WPRI had used the 12 News branding back in the 1980s.

Subchannels
The station's digital signal is multiplexed:

See also
Channel 12 digital TV stations in the United States
Channel 64 virtual TV stations in the United States

References

External links
  (DT1)
  (DT2)

1953 establishments in Rhode Island
Fox network affiliates
The CW affiliates
Rewind TV affiliates
Antenna TV affiliates
Mass media in Providence, Rhode Island
Nexstar Media Group
Television channels and stations established in 1953
NAC-TV
NAC-TV